Ouahigouya is a town in northern Burkina Faso. It is the capital of the Yatenga Province and one of its subdivisions the Ouahigouya Department. It is also the biggest town in the Nord Region.

The city itself has a stadium, a private non-profit Paediatric Hospital with 36 beds for giving birth and 24 beds for children suffering of severe malnutrition, a post office with internet access and at least one Ecobank bank branch.

History

The city was founded in 1757 as the capital of Yatenga one of a number of Mossi Kingdoms.  The city still bears testimony to its role as capital of the Yatenga Kingdom in its name, the meaning of which is come and prostrate yourselves.

In the Christmas War of 1985, the city's marketplace was bombed by Malian forces, almost 100 people being killed.

Economy

Mainly of an agriculturally based economy, Ouahigouya also has some commerce and craft industry. The two dams just north and west of the town permit it to pursue some vegetable planting aided by irrigation, such as tomatoes, carrots, onions and mainly potatoes. But as a whole both the region and the city are heavily dependent on rainfall and it is according to it that the population's well-being mostly depends on. Millet and sorghum though are the basis of the local diet, much like the surrounding regions.

The small craft industry here is mainly focused on leather and tanneries. The little industry in the region is mostly geared towards gold prospecting, and is carried out by a large company. In terms of commerce, the city takes advantage of its relative ease of access to the country's capital, Ouagadougou, to buy manufactured products and resell to the local economy. This is greatly facilitated by the asphalted road linking the two cities.

Places of interest

Features of Ouahigouya include Naaba Kango's tomb, the Yatenga Naba's compound and an artificial lake.

Geography

Climate
Classified by Köppen-Geiger system as hot semi-arid (BSh).

Sister Cities
Ouahigouya has one sister city:
 Decatur, United States

See also
 List of cities in Burkina Faso

Notes

References

External links 
 

Populated places in the Nord Region (Burkina Faso)
Populated places established in 1757
Yatenga Province